General Sir John Theodosius Burnett-Stuart,  (14 March 1875 – 6 October 1958) was a British Army general in the 1920s and 1930s.

Military career
Educated at Repton School and the Royal Military College, Sandhurst, John Burnett-Stuart was commissioned into the Rifle Brigade (The Prince Consort's Own) as a second-lieutenant on 6 March 1895. He was promoted to lieutenant on 26 July 1897, and saw service on the North-West Frontier of India between 1897 and 1898. He also served in the Second Boer War in South Africa between 1899 and 1902, during which he was promoted to captain on 20 February 1901, and awarded the Distinguished Service Order in 1900. Following the end of the war in June 1902, Burnett-Stuart returned to the United Kingdom on the SS Orotava which arrived at Southampton in early September.

He served in the First World War as a General Staff Officer in the British Expeditionary Force rising to become Deputy Adjutant General at General Headquarters for the British Armies in France in 1917.

After the War, in 1919, he was appointed General Officer Commanding Madras District in India where he was involved in the suppression of the Moplah Rebellion at Malabar between 1921 and 1922. The riots that he quashed were inspired by 10,000 guerrillas and led to 2,300 executions.

He returned to the United Kingdom and became Director of Military Operations and Intelligence at the War Office in 1923 and then General Officer Commanding 3rd Division in 1926. In 1927 he directed exercises by an experimental Mechanised force on Salisbury Plain in Wiltshire. He was appointed General Officer Commanding the British Troops in Egypt in 1931 and General Officer Commanding-in-Chief of Southern Command in 1934: he retired in 1938.

He was also Aide-de-Camp General to King George V from 1935 to 1938 and Colonel Commandant of 1st Battalion Rifle Brigade from 1936 to 1945. He commanded the 1st Aberdeen Battalion of the Home Guard and was Deputy Lieutenant for Aberdeenshire.

Further reading
To Change an Army: General Sir John Burnett-Stuart and British Armoured Doctrine, 1927–38 By Harold R Winton, Elsevier, 1988,

References

|-

|-

|-
 

|-

1875 births
1958 deaths
Military personnel from Gloucestershire
British Army generals of World War I
Knights Grand Cross of the Order of the Bath
Knights Commander of the Order of the British Empire
Companions of the Order of St Michael and St George
Companions of the Distinguished Service Order
Rifle Brigade officers
Deputy Lieutenants of Aberdeenshire
People educated at Repton School
British Army personnel of the Second Boer War
British Home Guard officers
Graduates of the Royal Military College, Sandhurst
British Army generals